Chicagolicious is an American reality television series on the Style Network. The series debuted on June 11, 2012. The series is a spin-off of the popular series Jerseylicious.

Premise
The series follows AJ Johnson, owner of a thriving salon in Chicago, and his staff of hair stylists and makeup artists as they service elite clientele and solidify their place in Chicago society.

Cast

Main cast
AJ Johnson: owner of AJ's of Chicago.
Katrell Mendenhall: a former model and lead make-up artist at AJ's salon.
Macray Huff: a full stylist and has expertise with extensions.
Austin Maxfield: the youngest of the salon; make-up artist.
Valincia Saulsberry: spent more time at AJ's salon than any other stylist; bumps heads with Katrell; been in the business for over 20 years.

Supporting cast
Niki Robinson: best friend and roommate of AJ; salon manager; she also sometimes clashes with new stylists at the salon.
Q Lacey: AJ's cousin; the salon's director of marketing and sales.
Howard Godfrey: the head barber at the salon.
Julie Darling: a client of AJ's; publicist who specializes in the lifestyle and luxury market.
Jennifer Knuth: Julie's junior associate; finishing her college degree in Arts Entertainment Media Management

Episodes

Season 1: 2012-2013

References

2010s American reality television series
2012 American television series debuts
2013 American television series endings
American television spin-offs
African-American reality television series
Television shows set in Chicago
Television shows filmed in Illinois
English-language television shows
Style Network original programming
Reality television spin-offs
Television series by Endemol